Naung Na Jatan  (born 5 September 1956) is a Burmese politician who currently serves as an Amyotha Hluttaw MP for Kachin State No. 4 constituency. He is a member of the National League for Democracy.

Early life and education
Naung Na Jatan was  born on 5 March 1956 in Tanai, Kachin State, Myanmar. He is an ethnic Kachin. His former work is as a farmer.

Political career
He is a member of the National League for Democracy. In the 2015 Myanmar general election, he was elected as an Amyotha Hluttaw MP, winning a majority of 5731 votes and elected representative from Kachin State No. 4 parliamentary constituency.

References

National League for Democracy politicians
1956 births
Living people
People from Kachin State
Burmese people of Kachin descent
Members of the House of Nationalities
21st-century Burmese politicians